Prime Time is the debut album by NFL Hall of Famer and MLB star Deion Sanders, released in December 1994, on Hammer's Bust It Records.

The album peaked at No. 70 on the Top R&B/Hip-Hop Albums and No. 14 on the Top Heatseekers.

Album history 
The album was released on December 26, 1994 by Capitol Records, via Hammer's Bust It Records label. Despite universally negative reviews, the album reached No. 70 on the Top R&B/Hip-Hop Albums and No. 14 on the Top Heatseekers. "Must Be the Money" was the only single released, which failed to make it on the charts. 

Sanders performed a medley of songs from the album (including "Must Be the Money" and "Heidi Heidi Hey"), while hosting during the twentieth season of Saturday Night Live on February 18, 1995.

The Encore Remix (2005) is a remix album by Sanders on Bungalo Records. It featured a remix for every song Prime Time. The album featured the song "Straight To My Feet", and two versions of Sanders' song, "Must Be the Money".

Reception

AllMusic panned the album, lamenting that the "...dual-sport superstar Deion Sanders didn't bring the same game to the recording studio as he did to the playing field ...it's not just for sports fans -- it's not for anyone.

Track listing
"Time for Prime" – :30
"Prime Time Keeps On Ticking" – 4:09
"Y U NV ME?" – 4:15
"Must Be The Money" – 4:17
"It's All Real" – 4:24
"2 B Me" – 3:52
"Say Hi to the Bad Guy" – 4:17
"We Can Roll" – 4:10
"House of Prime" – 4:06
"It Ain't Ovr Yet" – 3:31
"Movin'" – 3:51
"Heidy Heidy Hey" – 4:02
"Papa San" – 5:16
"Sum'n About That Woman" – 4:48
"It's On" – 3:54
"Time for Prime (Reprise)" – :30

References

Deion Sanders albums
1995 debut albums
Capitol Records albums
Albums produced by Dallas Austin
G-funk albums